Pubs in the Ottoman Empire is about pubs ( Lisān-ı Osmānī)  and pub culture and history of pubs and taverns in the Ottoman Empire.

Pubs appeared first during the time of the Ottoman Empire and rapidly increased in popularity, becoming an institution that housed all kinds of people from different segments of society. In the beginning of the 1800's pubs in Istanbul numbered around 500.

During the reign of Selim the Grim alcohol consumption in the Ottoman Empire increased particularly and pub establishments started to appear more regularly as separate buildings built from masonry, with arched windows and doors and earth floors.

Historical descriptions

Renowned Ottoman journalist Basiretçi Ali Efendi (1838–1912) has described the Golden Horn coast and especially the pubs around Balat in the beginning of the 1800's.

Author Sadri Sema (1880–1964) describes the pub culture in Istanbul in the beginning of the 1900's as follows:

Further reading

References

Sources

Ottoman culture